You Sing Loud, I Sing Louder is a father-daughter drama film starring real life father and daughter Ewan McGregor and Clara McGregor. Directed by Emma Westenberg in her feature length debut, it was written by Ruby Caster from an original story by Caster, Clara McGregor and Vera Bulder. It had its world premiere at the SXSW Film Festival on March 11, 2023.

Cast
 Clara McGregor
 Ewan McGregor
 Vera Bulder
 Jake Weary
 Kim Zimmer

Plot
A father secretly drives his estranged daughter to rehab after she has had overdose aware that she has inherited his addiction problems, and after he has started a new family elsewhere.

Production
Christine Vachon acted as producer. Clara McGregor is credited as a producer, as well as with the story alongside scriptwriter Ruby Caster and producer/actress Vera Bulder. The idea for the story drew on aspects of the McGregor’s own father-daughter relationship, Ewan McGregor told Deadline Hollywood that the film “can be very meta and still definitely be a work of fiction and not at all biographical... I don’t suggest this is autobiographical, but there we were, playing father and daughter and we are that. You can’t help but have that be in the room.” Principal photography lasted twenty two days, but Clara McGregor and the other production staff were on set for a few months prior.

Release
The film has its premiere at the SXSW Film Festival in Austin, Texas on March 11, 2023.

Reception
The Mcgregor’s as “actors bring a weathered authenticity to this story” according to Tim Grierson in Screen Daily.

References

External links

2023 films
2023 drama films
2023 directorial debut films
Films about father–daughter relationships 
Films about addiction
Films about substance abuse